Justine Henin-Hardenne was the defending champion and successfully defended her title, by defeating Kim Clijsters 6–4, 4–6, 7–5 in the final.

It was the 3rd title in the year for Henin-Hardenne and the 9th in her career.

Seeds
The first nine seeds received a bye into the second round.

Draw

Finals

Top half

Section 1

Section 2

Bottom half

Section 3

Section 4

References
 Main and Qualifying Draws

MasterCard German Open - Singles
WTA German Open